Events in the year 2022 in the Solomon Islands.

Incumbents 

 Monarch: Elizabeth II (until 8 September); then Charles III 
 Governor-General: David Vunagi
 Prime Minister: Manasseh Sogavare

Events 
Ongoing — COVID-19 pandemic in Solomon Islands

 4 January – A search continues for 14 people missing at sea in the Solomon Islands, after their boat failed to reach the Shortland Islands. Efforts were called off yesterday due to bad weather.
 31 March – Micronesian president David Panuelo urges Solomon Islands to not sign a security pact with China, citing "grave security concerns" and arguing that the Pacific islands would be "the epicenter of major confrontation" between major powers.
 18 April – United States officials plan to travel to Solomon Islands due to concerns that the country is making a security pact with China. The U.S. fears the proposed agreement could lead to Chinese troops being deployed to Solomon Islands.
 19 April – The foreign ministers of the People's Republic of China and Solomon Islands sign a security pact.
 30 August – The United States Embassy in Canberra says that the government of Solomon Islands will place a moratorium on US Navy ships entering its ports amid deteriorating relations between the two countries.
 8 September – The parliament of Solomon Islands votes to delay the next general election amid objections by opposition parties, who accuse Prime Minister Manasseh Sogavare of a "power grab".
 8 September – Accession of Charles III as King of Solomon Islands following the death of Queen Elizabeth II.
 12 September – Charles III is officially proclaimed King of Solomon Islands by the Governor-General in Honiara.
 12 September – A national holiday occurs in Solomon Islands to mourn the passing of Elizabeth II, Queen of Solomon Islands.
 14 September – A memorial church service takes place at the Saint Barnabas Anglican Cathedral on to celebrate the life and reign of Queen Elizabeth II.
 19 September – The Governor-General attends the funeral of Queen Elizabeth II in London.

Deaths 

 7 August– Ezekiel Alebua, 75, politician, prime minister (1986–1989) and MP (1980–1987) (born 1947)
 8 September – Elizabeth II, 96, Queen of Solomon Islands since 1978 (born 1926)

References 

 
2020s in the Solomon Islands
Years of the 21st century in the Solomon Islands
Solomon Islands
Solomon Islands